Stewart Memorial Presbyterian Church, now Redeemer Missionary Baptist Church, is a Prairie School church in the Lyndale neighborhood of Minneapolis, Minnesota, United States.  Prairie School architecture was uncommon for use in churches.  This church, which has a flat roof and broad eaves but lacks a bell tower and other traditional church features, was inspired by Frank Lloyd Wright's Unity Temple in Oak Park, Illinois.  It was designed by the firm of Purcell & Feick before George Grant Elmslie became a partner of the firm.  The congregation was an offshoot of First Presbyterian Church and was named after the Reverend David Stewart.

The main portion of the church is organized around a cube-shaped auditorium with light provided by a wall of eastward-facing green-tinted windows.  It has a narrower section with a deep balcony that extends to the south.  Decoration is relatively modest, consisting mainly of wood strips in geometric patterns.  The exterior is faced in brick and stucco.  The church was listed on the National Register of Historic Places in 1978.  In 1988, Redeemer Missionary Baptist Church bought the building and raised over $2 million for restoration and renovation.

References

External links

"The Architecture and Design of the Prairie School: Stewart Memorial Presbyterian Church" on Minneapolis Institute of Arts
"Stewart Memorial Presbyterian Church/Redeemer Missionary Baptist Church" on City of Minneapolis
"Redeemer Missionary Baptist Church: Minneapolis, Minnesota Case Study" by Maianne Preble on the Preservation Alliance of Minnesota

20th-century Presbyterian church buildings in the United States
Baptist churches in Minnesota
Churches completed in 1910
Churches on the National Register of Historic Places in Minnesota
Churches in Minneapolis
National Register of Historic Places in Minneapolis
Prairie School architecture in Minnesota
Presbyterian churches in Minnesota
Purcell and Elmslie buildings